Oscar Ofori Larbi (born 14 September 1966) is a Ghanaian politician and member of the National Democratic Congress. He is the member of parliament for the Aowin Constituency, in the Western North Region of Ghana.

Early life and education 
Larbi hails from Adukrom. He holds a certificate in Public administration.

References 

1966 births
Living people
Ghanaian MPs 2021–2025
People from Eastern Region (Ghana)
National Democratic Congress (Ghana) politicians